A Sangue Freddo is the second studio album by the Italian band Il Teatro degli Orrori, released in 2009.

Album
In this album emerged especially the most inspired song, Padre Nostro is a revisiting of the Pater Noster which the group dedicated to Jesus Christ, considered a revolutionary character, and Majakovskij, a re-reading of the poem "Beloved himself dedicates these lines the author" of Vladimir Vladimirovich Mayakovsky, Russian poet .

This album was considered by Rolling Stone magazine's 30th best album ever released in Italy.

Track list
Io ti aspetto – 3:57
Due – 2:45
A sangue freddo – 2:58 
Mai dire mai – 3:44
Direzioni diverse – 3:42
Il terzo mondo – 3:11
Padre nostro – 4:12
Majakovskij – 5:32
Alt! – 3:40
È colpa mia – 5:28
La vita è breve – 3:34
Die Zeit – 10:52

Line Up
 Pierpaolo Capovilla – voice
 Gionata Mirai – guitar
 Tommaso Mantelli – bass
 Nicola Manzan – violin, guitar
 Francesco Valente – drums

References

2009 albums
Il Teatro degli Orrori albums